Georg-Peeter Meri (7 October 1900 – 10 June 1983) was an Estonian diplomat, literary scholar and translator.

He took part in Estonian War of Independence, belonging to Tallinn Defence Battalion.

1934-1938 he was a diplomat of Estonia to Germany.

In 1938 he was awarded with Order of the White Star, III class.

His son was Estonian president Lennart Meri.

References

1900 births
1983 deaths
Estonian diplomats
Estonian translators
Estonian literary scholars
Recipients of the Order of the White Star, 3rd Class
Estonian military personnel of the Estonian War of Independence
Gulag detainees
Prisoners and detainees of the Soviet Union
Burials at Metsakalmistu